Lights Out Asia is a Milwaukee, Wisconsin based post-rock and electronic band that formed in February 2003.

History
Lights Out Asia formed in Milwaukee, Wisconsin in February 2003 when Chris Schafer and Mike Ystad, former members of Aurore Rien, decided to abandon the traditional post-rock band concept of their previous group and explore the intersection of post-rock, electronic and ambient music. In a short period, the two had written enough material for a full length album. This work would come to be known as Garmonia, Lights Out Asia's first documented recording as a band. Garmonia was released in 2003 to favorable reviews. By October 2003 the group was already opening for Mogwai.

Shortly after the release of Garmonia, Lights Out Asia added bassist/guitarist Mike Rush to the lineup. The band was signed to electronic label n5MD in 2007, and has released three albums on that imprint, as well as several remixes and contributions to the Chicago-based electronic/industrial label Tympanik. The band released In the Days of Jupiter in 2010, followed by Hy-Brasil in 2012.

The band is known for their blending of synthesized atmospheres, samples and electronic beats with tracks of effects-laden delayed guitars. Chris Schafer's vocals are often mixed low, treated almost as another instrument, akin to dream-pop or shoegazing arrangements.

Members
 Mike Ystad - electronics
 Chris Schafer - guitar, vocals

Former members
 Mike Rush - guitar, bass

Discography

Albums
 Garmonia (2003)
 Tanks and Recognizers (2007)
 Eyes Like Brontide (2008)
 In the Days of Jupiter (2010)
 Hy-Brasil (2012)

Compilations
 Test Tones Vol. 4 (2005) - "Knock Knock"
 Little Darla Has a Treat For You Vol.25 (2007) - "Airports, Crying Airplanes"
 Emerging Organisms Vol.2 (2008) - "Outstretched To the Middle of the Sky"
 One Five Zero (2009) - "Psiu! Puxa!"

See also 
List of ambient music artists

References

External links
 Band MySpace
 Artist Page on n5MD
 Interview with Chris Schafer on Arrhythmia Sound (in Russian)

American post-rock groups
Rock music groups from Wisconsin
American ambient music groups
Musicians from Milwaukee